The 1919 American Cup was the annual open cup held by the American Football Association.

American Cup Bracket

(*)protested, replayed at Pawtucket

Final

See also
1919 National Challenge Cup

References

Amer
American Cup